The International Towers is a commercial skyscraper complex in central Sydney, in the Barangaroo area. Construction on the towers began in 2013 before completion in mid 2016. The complex was built as part of a major urban redevelopment of Barangaroo, forming part of the core commercial, residential, retail and leisure development at Barangaroo South. More than 50 per cent of the Barangaroo South precinct (7.6 hectares) is accessible to the public. The ITS development delivers 283,900 m2 of commercial office space.

The three office skyscrapers, individually known as International Tower 1, 2 and 3, were designed by Rogers Stirk Harbour + Partners.

Construction
The tallest tower, known as Tower 1 is a 217m commercial building comprising 49 floors. It was completed in mid 2016. PricewaterhouseCoopers signed as the anchor tenant and HSBC and Marsh & McLennan Companies also signed a tenancy agreement. The Syrian Opposition representation office in Australia is located in this building.

Tower 2 is a 178m high-rise comprising 43 floors. Two major tenants of the central tower of the three buildings are Westpac and corporate law firm, Gilbert + Tobin who occupy more than 80% of the tower's space. IT2 was the first tower to start construction from July 2013 and was completed in June 2015, with Westpac Group employees starting to move into the precinct from August 2015.

Tower 3 is a 168m tall building comprising 39 floors. Main tenant KPMG signed a 14-year lease to occupy the top 15 floors from January 2016 and Lendlease also made Tower Three its Sydney headquarters from July 2016. IT3 was topped out in November 2015 and was completed in mid 2016.
Tower Three has a new medical centre, MyHealth Barangaroo Medical Centre, on the 1st floor at 300 Barangaroo Avenue. Also on the 1st floor is National Dental Care. Together these will provide a convenient medical and dental service for the growing community.

Timeline

Towers

See also

 List of tallest buildings in Sydney

References

External links
 
 

Skyscrapers in Sydney
Office buildings in Sydney
Modernist architecture in Australia
Skyscraper office buildings in Australia
Office buildings completed in 2016